Semiana is a comune (municipality) in the Province of Pavia in the Italian region Lombardy, located about 50 km southwest of Milan and about 35 km west of Pavia. As of 31 December 2004, it had a population of 256 and an area of 9.9 km².

Semiana borders the following municipalities: Lomello, Mede, Sartirana Lomellina, Valle Lomellina, Velezzo Lomellina.

Demographic evolution

References

Cities and towns in Lombardy